Sunset Strippers were an electronic music group from the UK. They are known for their 2005 song "Falling Stars", which samples the 1988 hit song "Waiting for a Star to Fall" by Boy Meets Girl and was involved in a sampling battle with Cabin Crew. "Falling Stars" reached number 3 on the UK Singles Chart in March 2005.

History 
Members Sergei Forster-Hall and Kieron McTernan met in Northbrook College.

In 2004, Sunset Strippers remixed the top 25 hit "Cry Little Sister", originally written by Gerard McMahon (under the pseudonym "Gerard McMann") as the theme tune for the film The Lost Boys. In 2005, they remixed Planet Funk's song "The Switch", which featured in Mitsubishi television advertisements, and in 2007 they remixed Irish pop band Westlife's "Total Eclipse of the Heart" for The Love Album. The group's last release under the Sunset Strippers name was "Step Right Up" in 2008, which appears on the downloadable version of Clubbers Guide '08 by Ministry of Sound.

Forster-Hall and McTernan began releasing under the name My Digital Enemy in 2006, which continued until they renamed themselves MDE in 2017. They release mostly tech house and deep house music.

"Falling Stars" music video 
The music video for "Falling Stars" features choreographer Benji Weeratunge listening to the song in his headphones while washing his clothes in a launderette. Three attractive young women enter the launderette and begin to dance all at once while washing their clothes as well. While waiting for their clothes, the women strike poses while Harry tries to attract their attention to him. The women also dance around the launderette, until they are seen wearing white shirts and red shorts. They begin dancing with Benji while holding a microphone. An old woman and her dog arriving at the launderette see Benji singing (in lip-sync form) inside with a mop as a microphone. It turns out the whole thing with the women was only his imagination. Disgusted, the old woman and the dog leave the launderette. Benji still continues to sing the song (in lip-sync form), even though he pretends nothing has happened.

References

External links
 
 

English electronic music groups
English house music groups
Musical groups from Brighton and Hove
British musical trios